The men's 200 metres event at the 2010 World Junior Championships in Athletics was held in Moncton, New Brunswick, Canada, at Moncton Stadium on 22 and 23 July.

Medalists

Results

Final
23 July
Wind: +0.5 m/s

Semifinals
22 July

Semifinal 1
Wind: +2.1 m/s

Semifinal 2
Wind: +2.0 m/s

Semifinal 3
Wind: +2.3 m/s

Heats
22 July

Heat 1
Wind: +0.2 m/s

Heat 2
Wind: +0.7 m/s

Heat 3
Wind: +0.7 m/s

Heat 4
Wind: +0.5 m/s

Heat 5
Wind: +0.9 m/s

Heat 6
Wind: +0.3 m/s

Participation
According to an unofficial count, 47 athletes from 35 countries participated in the event.

References

200 metres
200 metres at the World Athletics U20 Championships